Serxhio Emini (born 3 December 2002) is an Albanian professional footballer who plays as a winger for Albanian club Tomori on loan from Bylisi.

Career statistics

Club

References

External links
 Profile FSHF.org
 

2002 births
Living people
People from Sarandë
People from Vlorë County
Sportspeople from Vlorë
Association football midfielders
Association football forwards
Albanian footballers
Luftëtari Gjirokastër players
Kategoria Superiore players